Adam Baboulas (born April 5, 1987) is a professional Canadian football offensive lineman who most recently played for the Edmonton Eskimos of the Canadian Football League. He was drafted 41st overall by the BC Lions in the 2010 CFL Draft and signed a contract with the team on May 25, 2010. He played college football for the Saint Mary's Huskies.

References

External links
Edmonton Eskimos bio 
BC Lions bio

1987 births
BC Lions players
Canadian football offensive linemen
Edmonton Elks players
Living people
Players of Canadian football from Ontario
Saint Mary's Huskies football players
Sportspeople from Oshawa